Ayn al-Tineh may refer to:

Lebanon
 , a village in Western Beqaa District

Palestine
 El Tineh, former Palestinian village

Syria
 Ayn al-Tineh, Latakia Governorate, a town
 Ayn al-Tineh, Tartus Governorate, a village
 Ain al-Tinah, a village in Rif Dimashq Governorate
 Ayn al-Tineh al-Gharbiyah, a village in Homs Governorate
 Ayn al-Tineh al-Sharqiyah, a village in Homs Governorate